Mamadou Lamine Gueye (born 13 March 1998) is a Senegalese professional footballer who plays as a forward for Ligue 2 club FC Metz.

Career 
Gueye made his Ligue 1 debut for Metz on 13 September 2020 in a 1–0 away defeat against Lille. He was to join Ligue 2 side Paris FC on loan in October 2020 but the transfer was cancelled due to an administrative regulation disallowing a loan inside the country.

On 25 January 2022, Gueye was loaned to Paris FC until the end of the season.

References

External links

1998 births
Living people
Senegalese footballers
Association football forwards
People from Kolda Region
Génération Foot players
FC Metz players
Pau FC players
Paris FC players
Ligue 1 players
Ligue 2 players
Championnat National players
Senegalese expatriate footballers
Expatriate footballers in France
Senegalese expatriate sportspeople in France